Jeff Stanzler is an American screenwriter and director.  He wrote and directed the 1992 film Jumpin' at the Boneyard along with the 2005 psychological thriller, Sorry, Haters, an "official selection" in both the Toronto International and American Film Institute film festivals.  He is currently working on a documentary about politics in West Africa.  He's married to Annouchka Yameogo-Stanzler.

Selected filmography
Jumpin' at the Boneyard (1992)
Sorry, Haters (2005)

External links
Stanzler bio The Huffington Post

Video interview

American bloggers
Living people
Year of birth missing (living people)